The Toba River is a river in the Canadian province of British Columbia. Also referred to as the East Toba river.

Course
The Toba River originates in the Coast Mountains and flows generally southwest from Toba Glacier to the head of Toba Inlet.

Toba Montrose
In 2004 development of a 235 MW run of river energy project began on East Toba River. The $660 million project is funded and operated through a private loan from a partnership of lenders led by Manulife Financial Canada. Plutonic Power Corporation and GE Energy also referred to as the Toba Montrose General Partnership are the main stakeholders in the project . Construction is overseen by the Kiewit Corporation in partnership with the Sliammon and K'ómoks First Nation Territory Agreement. On 7 March 2011, it was announced that Magma Energy and Plutonic Power will merge to create Alterra Power Corp. The Toba Montrose Project was in operation in August 2010.

Upper Toba Valley

See also
List of British Columbia rivers

References

Rivers of the Pacific Ranges